Benalla 
At the  the population was 10,822.

It is the administrative centre for the Rural City of Benalla local government area.

History
Prior to the European settlement of Australia, the Benalla region was populated by the Taungurung people, an Indigenous Australian people. A 1906 history recounts that prior to white settlement "as many as 400 blacks would meet together in the vicinity of Benalla to hold a corrobboree". The area was first sighted by Europeans during an expedition of Hamilton Hume and William Hovell in 1824 and was noted as an agricultural settlement called "Swampy".  The expedition was followed by that of Major Thomas Mitchell in 1834.

Rev. Joseph Docker settled in 1838 creating a pastoral run called Benalta Run, said to be from an Aboriginal word for musk duck. Docker's property was intended to lend its name to the new township (”Benalta“) but through a clerical error in the Sydney Survey department it became known as 'Benalla'. An attack by indigenous people on the camp of sheepherders George and William Faithful became known as the Faithful Massacre; eight settlers were killed in the incident.  Following the massacre, in 1839 a police station was established and the name of the settlement became Broken River.
The post office opened on 1 December 1844 originally named Broken River. A bridge was built over the Broken River in 1847 and the following year the town was surveyed. In 1861, it was proclaimed a town. It was proclaimed a city in 1965.

In 1936, the Benalla Centenary Race was held.

Population
According to the 2021 census of Population, there were 9,316 people in Benalla.
 Aboriginal and Torres Strait Islander people made up 2.0% of the population. 
 81.4% of people were born in Australia. The next most common country of birth was England at 2.4%.
 87.6% of people only spoke English at home. 
 The most common responses for religion were No Religion 41.9%, Catholic 19.1% and Anglican 11.6%.

Geography 

Benalla is situated on a mostly flat floodplain of the Broken River catchment situated directly to the north and west of the Great Dividing Range. Lake Benalla is an artificial lake created in 1973 from the Broken River as an ornamental feature for the centre of the city.  Broken river forms a green belt along the north–south spine of the city.  There are three major crossings of the river at Benalla. The main street in the Central Business District is Bridge Street East.

Another large artificial lake, Lake Mokoan, 7 kilometres to the north east, was decommissioned beginning in 2009, with a wetlands area being developed for visitors. To the south of the freeway is the heavily forested Reef Hills State Park.

Government 
Benalla is the seat of local government and administrative headquarters for the Rural City of Benalla.

In the Victorian Legislative Assembly, it is represented by the Electoral district of Euroa.

In the Parliament of Australia, it is represented by the Division of Indi in the Australian House of Representatives.

Economy 
Industries include agricultural support services, tourism, a medium density fibreboard factory, Thales Australia ammunition factory and aviation.

As a service economy for the region, Benalla has many large retailers, including a Coles, Woolworths, Aldi and a  Mitre 10 Home & Trade. Target Country on Bridge Street closed in April 2021.

Education 
Benalla has two secondary schools, Benalla P-12 College (which has four campuses comprising Prep-yr 2; yr 3–6; yrs 7–9 and 10–12), FCJ College and three primary schools:  Benalla P–12, St. Joseph's Primary School and Australian Christian College - Hume. McCristal's College was a private grammar school that used to exist in Benalla.

The Benalla Flexible Learning Centre offers an alternative education model for students up to 22 years old also.

The Goulburn Ovens Institute of TAFE has a campus in Benalla which includes the Benalla Performing Arts and Convention Centre opened in 2004 by Lynne Kosky MP, the then Minister of Education and Training. The campus included GRADA, a regional academy of dramatic art offering courses in Acting, Dance and Production and now specializes in Nursing and Engineering courses with direct links to local businesses for work placements. The other GoTafe campuses in the region include at Shepparton, Wangaratta and Seymour.

The Centre for Continuing Education also offers pre-employment programs in Benalla plus Aged Care programs with practical work experience at Cooinda Village.

Culture 

Benalla's cultural facilities include the Benalla Performing Arts and Convention Centre which includes a cinema and theatre.  The city also has a major art gallery which forms a landmark perched over Lake Benalla on the site of the original police station.
Benalla is fast becoming known as the street art capital of regional Australia with more than 50 major contemporary murals on the CBD Benalla Street Art trail, and beyond including local villages such as Goorambat and Winton Wetlands.  The annual Wall to Wall Street Art Festival has been held since 2015, curated by Juddy Roller Studios, usually the week before Easter.  Over one long-weekend dozens of world class artists create one giant outdoor gallery in the town. The Wall to Wall Festival also includes workshops, artist talks, live music, markets, street art tours and more. www.benallastreetart.com.au

Benalla is also home to an artist's hub known as North East Artisans - an entirely self funded, not for profit community art gallery run by volunteers. It features a shop gallery with the works of local artists, an exhibition space, artist studios and a cafe, with regular exhibitions and live music events featuring local, national and international musicians. North East Artisans recently celebrated its 5th birthday in 2019.

The Rose Festival is another annual local garden festival dating from 1967.  Now called "The Benalla Festival" it is held over the first two weekends in November with dozens of free and low cost events including the community Street Parade, Music by the Lake and fireworks, and A Day in the Gardens Market held in the Benalla Botanical Gardens.

Sport and recreation 
The town has an Australian rules football team (Benalla Saints) competing in the Goulburn Valley Football League and a team (Benalla All Blacks) competing in the Ovens & King Football League.

Benalla has a horse racing club, the Benalla Racing Club, which schedules around eleven race meetings a year including the Benalla Cup meeting in early October.

Benalla Wolfpack play rugby league in NRL Victoria's Murray Cup.

Golfers play at the Benalla Golf Club on Mansfield Road, which celebrated its centenary in 2003 or at the course of the Golden Vale Golf Club on Golden Vale Road, Benalla.

Benalla is also the closest major centre to Winton Motor Raceway, a privately owned motor racing circuit which holds motor racing event at all levels of domestic competition, including V8 Supercar.

Benalla Gardens Oval is the home of the Benalla & District Cricket Association. The ground has hosted touring teams since the 19th century. In the Rural City of Benalla there are numerous cricket grounds.

Benalla is also home to the Benalla Bandits Baseball Club who compete in the North East Baseball Association. The team plays out of Racecourse Reserve, Benalla.

Benalla is home to the Gliding Club of Victoria at the State Gliding Centre located on the Benalla airfield. This club is the longest continuous operating gliding club in Australia and has played host for the World Gliding Competition in 1987 and 2016. Many of the club's members travel from Europe each summer to enjoy the warm weather and ideal soaring conditions of the region.

There is a park and walking track that circumnavigates Lake Benalla, featuring a ceramic sculpture mural community that was created as part of an employment project for local artists.

Heritage 
The following sites are National Trust sites.
 Benalla Botanical Gardens.

 Stringybark Creek Site, famous in the Ned Kelly story.
 The former Shire Offices in Mair St, Benalla.
 The Kelly Gang camp site.
 Benalla Migrant Camp is listed on the Victorian Heritage Register.

Notable residents 

 Prue Acton – fashion designer
 John Brady – former VFL/AFL footballer – North Melbourne FC
 Robin Close – former AFL footballer – Essendon FC
 Baden Cooke – Olympic cyclist, Commonwealth medalist and winner of Tour de France green jersey
 Gary Cowton – AFL premiership footballer with North Melbourne
 Tommy Dunderdale – member of the Hockey Hall of Fame
 Edward "Weary" Dunlop – surgeon and World War II Prisoner of War
 Ivan Durrant – painter, sculptor, writer, performance artist
 James Flynn – former VFL/AFL footballer – Geelong FC, Carlton FC
 Shayne Greenman – Australian and world champion baker
 Albert Ernest Kitson – geologist and naturalist
 Tom Long – actor
 Lisa Maxwell – rock/pop/alternative solo artist.
 Graham Oppy – philosopher at Monash University
 Tom Rockliff – AFL footballer for Brisbane Lions FC
 Michael Joseph Savage – Prime Minister of New Zealand
 Hugh Sawrey – artist
 Mark Seymour – lead singer of Hunters & Collectors and solo artist
 Nick Seymour – bass player in Crowded House
 Robyn Smith - Australian disability sport administrator
 Jaclyn Symes – Member for Northern Victoria in the Victorian State Parliament
 Jarrad Waite – AFL footballer for Carlton FC and North Melbourne FC
 Hector Waller – captain of the light cruiser HMAS Perth in the Second World War
 John George Winchester Wilmot – Assistant District Surveyor, Benalla, 1855–60.

Media 
Benalla has a local newspaper, the Benalla Ensign, which is published weekly.

Infrastructure 
Health services are provided by Benalla Health, which operates a 42-bed hospital, plus a variety of Allied Health and maternal and Child Health Services.

Transport 

Benalla is a little over two hours from Melbourne by road or train. The Hume Freeway (National Highway M31) now by-passes Benalla to the south, while the Midland Highway (A300) runs through the city centre. Rail transport includes both passenger rail and freight. Benalla railway station is on the North East railway line, and three Albury V/Line rail services stop at Benalla daily, as does the twice-daily NSW TrainLink XPT service between Melbourne and Sydney.

Benalla Bus Lines runs a local service every hour on two routes, serving the west and east sides of the city. The main bus terminal is outside the ANZ Bank in Nunn Street.

Benalla Airport YBLA (BLN) began life as a major RAAF training base during World War II. It now also serves as the home of the Gliding Club of Victoria, as well as a ballooning and ultralight centre, and is the home of the Benalla Aviation Museum.

Utilities 
Water is supplied by North East Water.  The main water supply is Loombah Weir and McCall Say Reservoir in the Ryan's Creek Catchment approximately 13 kilometres south of the city with a total 1800 megalitre capacity.

References 

 Wilson, Robert, The Book of Australia, Lansdowne Press, 1980

External links 

 Australian Places – Benalla
 Benalla on Google Maps
 A Sydney Morning Herald Article on Benalla
 GOTAFE Regional Academy of Dramatic Arts (GRADA)
 Benalla Aviation Museum
 Gliding Club of Victoria

Cities in Victoria (Australia)
Rural City of Benalla
Hume Highway